Naval Network Warfare Command (NETWARCOM) is the United States Navy's information operations, intelligence, networks, and space unit. Naval Network Warfare Command's mission is to execute, under Commander TENTH Fleet Operational Control, tactical-level command and control of Navy Networks and to leverage Joint Space Capabilities for Navy and Joint Operations.

History
In 2002, some 23 organizations from several commands, including the former Naval Space Command, Naval Computer and Telecommunications Command, Fleet Information Warfare Center, and Navy Component Task Force - Computer Network Defense were brought together to form Naval Network Warfare Command, emphasizing the organization's focus on the operation and defense of the Navy's networks.

In 2005, with the disestablishment of Naval Security Group (NAVSECGRU), NETWARCOM brought the former Naval Security Group Activities (NSGAs) under its umbrella, designating them Naval Information Operation Center(s) (NIOC) and Naval Information Operation Detachment(s)  (NIOD).  The mission of the command fundamentally changed, making it the Navy's lead for Information Operations, as well as Networks and Space. 

The assumption, alignment, and integration of Fleet Intelligence Type Commander duties, responsibilities and functions at NETWARCOM in 2008 began a measured and evolutionary process to improve integrated Fleet Intelligence and ISR readiness. This alignment provides a single Fleet champion for ISR and positions Fleet Intelligence for better and timelier support to fleet operations.

In 2009, the Secretary of Defense directed the establishment of U.S. Cyber Command. Each of the services was also directed to establish a supporting command to U.S. Cyber Command; as a result, the Naval Informations Operations Centers (NIOC) were moved to the reestablished Tenth Fleet to help form U.S. Fleet Cyber Command. Naval Network Warfare Command was reorganized and its mission revised to "operate and defend the Navy's portion of the Global Information Grid and deliver reliable and secure Net-centric and space war-fighting capabilities in support of strategic, operational and tactical missions across the Navy".

The headquarters is at Navy Cyber Forces in Norfolk, Virginia.

Organization
Naval Network Warfare Command acts as Combined Task Force 1010 (network operations & defense) for Tenth Fleet
CTF 1010 - Naval Network Warfare Command
CTG 1010.3 - NCTAMS PAC
CTG 1010.4 - NCTAMS LANT

See also
 United States Tenth Fleet
 U.S. Navy Information Dominance Corps
 Naval Computer and Telecommunications Command
 Navy Information Operations Command, Hawaii

References

External links

 History of NAVNETWARCON Archived

Commands of the United States Navy
Military globalization
Military units and formations established in 2002
Cyberinfrastructure
Net-centric
Military units and formations in Virginia
Military communications units and formations of the United States